The Talking River Review is an American literary magazine founded in 1994 based at the Lewis-Clark State College in Lewiston, Idaho.  The magazine is published on a biannual basis. Work that has appeared in Talking River Review has been short-listed for the Pushcart Prize.

Notable contributors

Claire Davis
Mary Clearman Blew
William Studebaker
Kim Barnes

Robert Wrigley
Gary Finke
William Kittredge

Ronald Wallace
Paul Zarzyski
Stephen Dunn
Jacob M. Appel

Fred Melton
Gail Konop Baker
Anne Caylor MacAlpin

See also
List of literary magazines

References

External links
Talking River Review Homepage

Literary magazines published in the United States
Biannual magazines published in the United States
Magazines established in 1996
Magazines published in Idaho
Lewis–Clark State College